Arthur County may refer to:
 Arthur County, Nebraska
 the former name of Arthur Land District, Tasmania, Australia